Nyborg is a city in Denmark.

Nyborg may also refer to:
 Nyborg, Sweden, a village in Sweden
 Nyborg, Norway, a village north of Flaktveit, Norway

People with the surname
 Peter Nyborg (born 1969), Swedish tennis player
 Gunn Nyborg (born 1960), Norwegian football player
 Helmuth Nyborg (born 1937), Danish professor of developmental psychology at Aarhus University
 Keith Foote Nyborg, United States Ambassador to Finland
 Reidar Nyborg (1923–1990), Norwegian cross-country skier
 Torill Selsvold Nyborg (born 1952), Norwegian nurse, missionary and politician

Fictional
 Birgitte Nyborg, a character in Borgen